The 94th Fighter Squadron is a unit of the United States Air Force 1st Operations Group located at Joint Base Langley–Eustis, Virginia.  The 94th is equipped with the F-22 Raptor.

The 94 FS is one of the oldest units in the United States Air Force, first being organized on 20 August 1917 as the 94th Aero Squadron of the United States Army Air Service at Kelly Field, Texas.   The squadron deployed to France and fought on the Western Front during World War I as a pursuit squadron. It took part in the Champagne-Marne defensive; Aisne-Marne offensive; St. Mihiel offensive, and Meuse-Argonne offensive.

In 1924, it was consolidated with the 103d Aero Squadron (Pursuit).  The 103d was largely composed of former members of the French Air Service Lafayette Escadrille (from the French Escadrille de Lafayette).  This was a squadron of American volunteer pilots who had joined the French Air Service prior to the United States entry into the war on 6 April 1917. In July 1926, with the disestablishment of the U.S. Army Air Service, the squadron became part of the U.S. Army Air Corps (USAAC).

In June 1941, the squadron became part of the renamed U.S. Army Air Forces (USAAF).  During World War II the unit served in the Mediterranean Theater of Operations (MTO) as part of Twelfth Air Force as a P-38 Lightning fighter squadron, participating in the North African and Italian campaigns.  In September 1947, it became part of the newly established United States Air Force (USAF).  During the Cold War it was both an Air Defense Command (ADC) fighter-interceptor squadron, and later as part of Tactical Air Command (TAC).  It was one of the first USAF operational squadrons equipped with the F-15A Eagle in January 1976. With the disestablishment of TAC in 1992, it was assigned to the newly established Air Combat Command (ACC).

Overview
The 94 Fighter Squadron (94 FS) is tasked to provide air superiority for the United States and allied forces by engaging and destroying enemy forces, equipment, defenses or installations for global deployment as part of the 1st Fighter Wing.

The squadron flies one of today's most advanced air dominance fighters, the F-22A Raptor, being the USAF's second operational F-22 squadron in 2006.   94 FS aircraft, like other aircraft from the 1st Fighter Wing, have the tail code "FF".

History
The 94th Fighter Squadron has a long history and traditions that date back to World War I. The squadron was activated at Kelly Field, Texas, on 20 August 1917 as the 94th Aero Squadron.  On 8 April 1924, the unit was consolidated with the 103d Aero Squadron which was organized on 31 August 1917.

World War I
 See 94th Aero Squadron for an expanded World War I history

On 30 September 1917, two officers and 150 enlisted men left Texas for France and were sent to seven different aircraft factories for maintenance and repair training. In April 1918, the 94th was reunited and stationed at the Gengault Aerodrome near Toul, France, where it began operations as the first American squadron at the front.  It was placed under the command of Major Raoul Lufbery, an ace pilot and veteran of the Lafayette Escadrille.

As the first American squadron in operation, its aviators were allowed to create their squadron insignia. They used the opportunity to commemorate the United States' entry into World War I by taking the phrase of tossing one's "hat in the ring" (a boxing phrase to signify one's willingness to become a challenger) and symbolizing it with the literal image of Uncle Sam's red, white and blue top hat going through a ring.

On 14 April, Lt. Douglas Campbell and Lt. Alan Winslow downed two German aircraft. These were the first victories ever scored by an American unit. No 94th pilot achieved more aerial victories than 1st Lt. Edward V. "Eddie" Rickenbacker, who was named America's "Ace of Aces" during the war.  In his Nieuport 28 and later his SPAD S.XIII, Rickenbacker was credited with 26 of the squadron's 70 kills during World War I.  By the end of hostilities, the 94th had won battle honors for participation in 11 major engagements and was awarded the Croix de Guerre with Palm.

The squadron was assigned to the 1st Pursuit Group based at Toul (5 May 1918), and subsequently at Touquin (28 June 1918), Saints (9 July 1918) and Rembercourt (1 September 1918).  Rickenbacker took command of the squadron on 25 September, at the start of the Meuse Argonne Offensive, and retained it through the end of the war.  Another flying ace of this squadron was Harvey Weir Cook.

The 103d Aero Squadron constructed facilities, December 1917 – 1 February 1918; with flight echelon originally composed of former members of the Lafayette Escadrille, participated in combat as a pursuit unit with the French Fourth Army, French Sixth Army, Detachment of the Armies of the North (French), French Eighth Army, and the American First Army, 18 February – 10 November 1918.

On 8 April 1924, the 103d was consolidated by the Air Service with the 94th Pursuit Squadron.

Between the wars: 1920s and 1930s
The squadron returned home in the spring of 1919, and after several moves, the 94th settled with the 1st Pursuit Group at Selfridge Field, Michigan, in July 1922. In 1923, the unit was re-designated the 94th Pursuit Squadron. The squadron stayed in Michigan for the remainder of the inter-war years, training in its pursuit role. The squadron flew 17 different aircraft during this period, culminating with the P-38 Lightning. One week after Pearl Harbor, the 94th moved to Naval Air Station San Diego, California. Expecting to see action in the Pacific, the squadron instead received orders for Europe. In the summer of 1942, the 94th and its parent group deployed under its own power to England, the U.K., via Canada, Labrador, Greenland, and Iceland as part of Operation Bolero. This marked the first time that a fighter squadron flew its own aircraft from the United States to Europe.

World War II
In May 1942, all pursuit groups and squadrons were re-designated "fighter". In November the 94th Fighter Squadron entered combat in North Africa during Operation Torch. Based in Algeria, Tunisia, and Italy, the 94th again distinguished itself in combat by winning two Presidential Distinguished Unit Citations as part of the 1st Group. In addition, the squadron earned 14 Campaign honors, participating in almost every campaign in North Africa and Europe. 64 pilots of the 94th Fighter Squadron were credited with 124 Axis aircraft destroyed. The 94th produced a total of six aces in World War II. In April 1945 the 1st Fighter Group received two YP-80 jets for operational testing. The 94th Squadron's Major Edward LaClare flew two operational sorties in the YP-80 although without encountering combat.

Cold War

After the end of World War II, the 94th trained in the Lockheed P-80 Shooting Star, America's first operational jet fighter, and was stationed at March AFB, California. In July 1950, the group became the 94th Fighter Interceptor Squadron (FIS) and was eventually assigned to Air Defense Command (ADC), later renamed Aerospace Defense Command (ADC). After the P-80, the squadron flew several aircraft in the interceptor role, including the F-86, F-102 and F-106. In 1956, the 94th won the Worldwide Rocket Firing Meet held at Vincent AFB, Arizona. In the 1960s, the unit was among the first ready units sent to Florida during the Cuban Missile Crisis in October 1962. The squadron carried out combat air patrol missions off the coast of Florida, setting a record for F-106 hours and sorties. During the 1960s, the 94th, along with other ADC units, maintained an alert force in Alaska.

With its supersonic F-106s, the squadron intercepted Russian bombers on missions over the Bering Sea. Then, in June 1969, with tensions mounting following the Pueblo Incident and the downing of an EC-121 electronic observation plane by North Korea, the squadron deployed to Osan AB, South Korea, for six months. It then replaced the 75th FIS at Wurtsmith AFB, Michigan until 1 July 1971.  At that time, the squadron was redesignated the 94th Tactical Fighter Squadron, reassigned to Tactical Air Command, and reunited with the 27th and 71st Squadrons under the 1st Tactical Fighter Wing (1 TFW), flying the F-4E. The 94th assumed the duties of a Replacement Training Unit (RTU), providing F-4 aircrews for operational combat squadrons.

In 1975, the 1st TFW moved to Langley AFB, Virginia, and began the 94 TFS flying the F-15A and F-15B Eagle, with the squadron becoming combat-ready in early 1977. In September 1992, the squadron was renamed the 94th Fighter Squadron (94 FS).

The 94th Fighter Squadron did not deploy to Southwest Asia for the first Persian Gulf War, although many of its pilots and maintenance personnel did as augmenters to both the 71st and 27th Fighter Squadrons from the 1st Fighter Wing.  The 94th successfully supported the UN-sanctioned Operation Southern Watch and Operation Northern Watch in Iraq with many deployments to Saudi Arabia and Turkey in the period leading up to the Iraq War. The 94th Fighter Squadron pilots repeatedly defeated Iraqi surface-to-air missiles (SAMs) and anti-aircraft artillery (AAA) attacks while enforcing UN sanctions, without loss or damage to a single aircraft.

Since the September 11 attacks on the United States, the aircraft of the 94th have patrolled the skies of the East Coast of the United States.

Modern era
In 2006, the 94th became the second operational squadron to fly the F-22 Raptor, receiving its first F-22A in June 2006, and receiving its full complement of F-22As, with AF Ser. No / tail number (T/N) 05-0094, in June 2007. This was due to the 94 FS trading tail number 086 for 094 with the 90th Fighter Squadron, which is part of the 3rd Wing based at Elmendorf AFB, Alaska. 

Additionally, the 1st FW traded AF Ser. No. / tail number 05-0084 to the 90th Fighter Squadron for tail number 05-0101. Tail 10-194 is the current flagship of 94th Fighter Squadron.

2013 Sequestration
Air Combat Command officials announced a stand down and reallocation of flying hours for the rest of the fiscal year 2013 due to mandatory budget cuts.  The across-the board spending cuts, called sequestration, took effect 1 March when Congress failed to agree on a deficit-reduction plan.

Squadrons either stood down on a rotating basis or kept combat ready or at a reduced readiness level called "basic mission capable" for part or all of the remaining months in fiscal 2013. This affected the 94th Fighter Squadron with a stand-down grounding from 9 April-30 September 2013.

Lineage
 103d Aero Squadron
 Organized as the 103d Aero Squadron on 31 August 1917
 Redesignated 103d Aero Squadron (Pursuit) on 13 February 1918
 Redesignated 103d Aero Squadron, 4 March 1919
 Demobilized on 18 August 1919
 Reconstituted on 8 April 1924 and consolidated with the 94th Pursuit Squadron as the 94th Pursuit Squadron

 94th Fighter Squadron
 Organized as the 94th Aero Squadron on 20 August 1917
 Redesignated 94th Aero Squadron (Pursuit) on 30 March 1918
 Redesignated 94th Aero Squadron on 1 June 1919
 Redesignated 94th Squadron (Pursuit) on 14 March 1921
 Redesignated 94th Pursuit Squadron on 25 January 1923
 Consolidated with the 103d Aero Squadron on 8 April 1924
 Redesignated 94th Pursuit Squadron (Interceptor) on 6 December 1939
 Redesignated 94th Pursuit Squadron (Fighter) on 12 March 1941
 Redesignated 94th Fighter Squadron (Twin Engine) on 15 May 1942
 Redesignated 94th Fighter Squadron, Two Engine on 28 February 1944
 Inactivated on 16 October 1945
 Redesignated 94th Fighter Squadron, Single Engine on 5 April 1946
 Redesignated 94th Fighter Squadron, Jet Propelled on 20 June 1946
 Activated on 3 July 1946
 Redesignated 94th Fighter Squadron, Jet on 15 June 1948
 Redesignated 94th Fighter-Interceptor Squadron on 16 April 1950
 Redesignated 94th Tactical Fighter Squadron on 1 July 1971
 Redesignated 94th Fighter Squadron on 1 November 1991

Assignments
 103d Aero Squadron

 Post Headquarters, Kelly Field, 31 August 1917
 Aviation Concentration Center, 5 November 1917
 Third Aviation Instruction Center, 28 December 1917
 Air Service Headquarters, American Expeditionary Force, 13 February 1918 (attached to Groupe de Combat 21 18 February 1918, Sixth Army (France) 11 April 1918, Army of the North (France) after 30 April 1918)

 2d Pursuit Group, 5 July 1918
 3d Pursuit Group, 7 August 1918
 1st Air Depot, 5 June 1919
 Advanced Section Services of Supply, 6–19 February 1919
 Eastern Department, 4 March-18 Aug 1919

 94th Aero (later, 94th Pursuit) Squadron

 Post Headquarters, Kelly Field, 20 August 1917
 Aviation Concentration Center, 5 October 1917
 Overseas transport: RMS Adriatic, 27 October-10 November 1917
 Headquarters Air Service, AEF, 12 November 1917
 Attached to French Air Service for training, 19 November 1917 – 24 January 1918
 3d Instructional Center, 24 January 1918

 1st Pursuit Organization Center, 30 March 1918
 1st Pursuit Group, 5 May 1918
 5th Pursuit Group, 20 November 1918
 1st Air Depot, 17 April 1919
 Advanced Section Services of Supply, 5 May 1919
 Post Headquarters, Mitchel Field, 1 June 1919
 1st Pursuit Group, 22 August 1919 to consolidation.

 Consolidated Squadron

 1st Pursuit (later, 1st Fighter) Group, from consolidation in 1924 to 16 October 1945
 1st Fighter (later, 1st Fighter-Interceptor) Group, 3 July 1946
 Attached to Alaskan Air Command, 13 October 1947 – 16 February 1948
 4705th Defense Wing, 6 February 1952
 27th Air Division, 1 March 1952
 1st Fighter Group, 18 August 1955

 1st Fighter Wing, 1 February 1961
 Attached to 314th Air Division, c. 6 June – 17 November 1969
 23d Air Division, 1 December 1969
 1st Tactical Fighter Wing, 1 July 1971
 1st Operations Group, 1 October 1991–present

Stations
 103d Aero Squadron

 Kelly Field, Texas, 31 August-30 October 1917
 Aviation Concentration Center, Garden City, New York, 5 November 1917
 Overseas transport: RMS Baltic, 23 November-7 December
 Liverpool, England, 8 December
 Windall Downs Rest Camp, Winchester, England, 8 December
 Southampton, England, 23 December
 American Rest Camp, Le Havre, France, 24 December
 Issoudun Aerodrome, France, 28 December
 La Noblette Aerodrome, France, 13 Feb 1918

 Bonne Maison Aerodrome, France, 8 April 1918
 Leffrinckouke Aerodrome, France, 30 April 1918
 Crochte Aerodrome, France, 6 June 1918
 Gengault Aerodrome (Toul), France, 30 June 1918
 Vaucouleurs Aerodrome, France, 7 August 1918
 Lisle-en-Barrois Aerodrome, France, 20 September 1918
 Foucaucourt Aerodrome, France, 6 November 1918
 Colombey-les-Belles Airdrome, France, 5 Jun 1919
 Brest, France, 6-19 Feb 1919
 Garden City, New York, 4-18 Mar 1919
 Undetermined, 19 March-18 Aug 1919

 94th Aero (later, 94th Pursuit) Squadron

 Kelly Field, Texas, 20 August 1917
 Aviation Concentration Center, Garden City, New York, 5–27 October 1917
 Liverpool, England, 10 November 1917
 British Rest Camp #2, Le Havre, France, 11 November 1917
 Reuilly Barracks, Paris, France, 18 November 1917
 Squadron divided into flights and sent to several locations in France for training
 Issoudun Aerodrome, France, 24 January 1918
 Epiez Aerodrome, France, 1 April 1918
 Gengault Aerodrome, Toul, France, 7 April 1918
 Touquin Aerodrome, France, 29 June 1918

 Saints Aerodrome, France, 9 July 1918
 Rembercourt Aerodrome, France, 30 August 1918
 Noers Aerodrome, Longuyon, France, 20 Nov 1918
 Coblenz Aerodrome, Germany, 31 Dec 1918
 Colombey-les-Belles Airdrome, France, 17 Apr 1919
 Le Mans, France, 5–18 May 1919
 Mitchel Field, New York, 1 Jun 1919
 Selfridge Field, Michigan, 27 June 1919
 Kelly Field, Texas, c. 31 August 1919
 Ellington Field, Texas, 1 July 1921
 Selfridge Field, Michigan, 1 July 1922 to consolidation.

 Consolidated Squadron

 Selfridge Field, Michigan, from consolidation in 1924
 San Diego Naval Air Station, California, 9 December 1941
 Long Beach Army Air Field, California, 6 February – 20 May 1942
 RAF Kirton in Lindsey, England, 10 June 1942
 RAF Ibsley, England, 27 August – 24 October 1942
 Tafaraoui Airfield, Algeria, 15 November 1942
 Nouvion Airfield, Algeria, 21 November 1942
 Youks-les-Bains Airfield, Algeria, 28 November 1942
 Detachments operated from Maison Blanche Airport, Algeria, 6–14 December 1942
 Biskra Airfield, Algeria, 14 December 1942
 Chateau-dun-du-Rhumel Airfield, Algeria, 14 February 1943
 Mateur Airfield, Tunisia, c. 20 June 1943
 Detachments operated from: Dittaino, Sicily, 6–18 September 1943
 Detachments operated from: Gambut, Libya, 4–12 October 1943
 Djedeida Airfield, Tunisia, c. 1 November 1943
 Monserrato, Sardinia, 29 November 1943

 Gioia del Colle Airfield, Italy, c. 10 December 1943
 Salsola Airfield, Italy, January 1944
 Detachments operated from: Aghione, Corsica, 10–18 August 1944
 Detachments operated from: Vincenzo Airfield, Italy, 9 January – 18 February 1945
 Lesina Airfield, Italy, 16 March 1945
 Marcianise, Italy, 26 September – 16 October 1945
 March Field (later, AFB), California, 3 July 1946
 Deployed at Ladd Field, Alaska, 13 October 1947 – 16 February 1948
 George AFB, California, 18 July 1950
 Selfridge AFB, Michigan, 18 August 1955
 Deployed at Osan AB, South Korea, c. 6 June – 17 November 1969
 Wurtsmith AFB, Michigan, 31 December 1969
 MacDill AFB, Florida, 1 July 1971
 Langley AFB, Virginia, 30 June 1975–present

Aircraft

103d Aero Squadron
 Spad VII, 1918
 Spad XIII, 1918

94th Aero (later, 94th Pursuit) Squadron
 Nieuport 28, 1918
 Spad XIII, 1918-1919
 Fokker D.VII, Albatros D.V, Pfalz D.III, and Roland D.VI, during 1919
 Royal Aircraft Factory S.E.5, 1919–1922
 Curtiss JN-4, JN-6, Airco DH.4, Orenco D, and PW-5, during the period 1919 to consolidation in 1924
 Thomas-Morse MB-3, 1922 to consolidation in 1924

Consolidated Squadron
 Thomas-Morse MB-3, from consolidation in 1924 to 1925
 PW-8, 1924–1926
 P-1 Hawk, 1925–1931
 P-2 Hawk, P-3 Hawk, and P-5 Hawk, 1926–1931
 Boeing P-12, 1930–1932
 P-6 Hawk, 1932
 Berliner-Joyce P-16, 1932–1934
 P-6 Hawk, P-26 Peashooter, and Consolidated P-30 (PB-2), 1934–1938
 Seversky P-35, 1934–1941
 P-36 Hawk, 1938–1940
 P-40 Warhawk (and probably P-43 Lancer), 1939–1941
 P-38 Lightning, 1941–1945
 P-80 Shooting Star, 1946–1949
 F-86D Sabre Interceptor, 1949–1960
 F-106 Delta Dart, 1960–1971
 F-4 Phantom II, 1971–1975
 F-15 Eagle, 1976–2005
 F-22A Raptor, 2006–present

See also

 Barber pole#Aviation and space flight for insignia on aircraft.
 Hamilton Coolidge
 Reed Chambers
 David M. Peterson
 Raoul Lufbery
 James Meissner
 Eddie Rickenbacker
 List of American Aero Squadrons
 List of World War I flying aces
 Lafayette Flying Corps

References
 Notes

 Citations

Bibliography

 
 
 
 
 

 Further reading
 Guttman, Jon. USAS 1st Pursuit Group. Botley, Oxford, UK: Osprey Publishing Ltd., 2008. .
 
 
 Woolley, Charles. The Hat in the Ring Gang: The Combat History of the 94th Aero Squadron in World War I. Atglen, Pennsylvania: Schiffer Publishing, . .

External links

 14 July 2008 - 90th anniversary Commemoration of 27th, 94th, 95th, 147th aero squadrons in France

094
Military units and formations in Virginia
094